The Humboldt Lightning Fire was a fire during the 2015 California Wildfire season. The fire started on July 30, 2015 in Humboldt County, California. The fire was started by a lightning strike from a thunderstorm that started multiple fires that day. The fire burned 4,883 acres, destroyed 7 buildings, and injured 14 people.

Terrain and Fuels 
The fire was burning in steep terrain with limited access. Fuels include heavy timber that was being used for revenue and income.

Personnel and Equipment 
There were 8 agencies working at this fire. 1,392 personnel and 39 crews were assigned to the fire. Resources for the fire included 10 helicopters, 57 engines, 8 bulldozers, and 10 water tenders.

References 

2015 California wildfires